Red Rock(s) (or red rock(s)) may refer to:

In generic contexts
Sandstone, in its predominant pinkish-to-deep-dull-red  coloration

Places

United States

U.S. settled places 
Red Rock, Arizona (disambiguation), several unincorporated communities in Arizona
Red Rock, Oklahoma, town
Red Rock, Texas, unincorporated community in Texas
Red Rock, West Virginia, unincorporated community
Red Rock, Wisconsin, unincorporated community

Scenic and recreational areas 
Red Rock Island, in San Francisco Bay, California
Red Rock Canyon National Conservation Area (state-operated), in Las Vegas, Nevada
Red Rocks Park, Colorado
Red Rock Pass (a saddle-point), Idaho
Red Rock State Park,    in Arizona
Red Rock Preserve, within Edge of Appalachia Preserve in Ohio 
Red Rock (Wyoming), inscribed rock formation
Red Rock (Gallup, New Mexico), along  Interstate 25 in New Mexico

Australia 
Red Rock (Victoria),  crater complex near Colac in Victoria
Red Rock, New South Wales,  small town near Grafton, New South Wales

Canada 
Red Rock, Ontario, a township in Ontario, Canada
Red Rock Indian Band, an Indian band in Ontario, Canada

Other countries 
Red Rock railway station, a former railway station in the Red Rock area of Standish, England

Titled works 
Novels:
Red Rock, by Thomas Nelson Page
Red Rock, by Terri Windling
TV and movies:
Red Rock (TV series), Irish soap opera  since  2015 
Red Rock West, 1993  Nicolas Cage film
 Songs
 HaSela haAdom (The Red Rock), Israeli song
 Beverage brands:
Red Rock Cola
Red Rock Cider

Other uses 
Red Rock (bull), brand #007, the ProRodeo Hall of Fame bucking bull
Red Rock Resort Spa and Casino, a casino in Summerlin, Nevada

See also
 Uses of "Red Rock" (singular), adjectivially in a geographic proper name:
Red Rock River (disambiguation)
Red Rock Canyon (disambiguation)
Red Rock Lake (disambiguation)
Red Rocks (disambiguation)